Parents is a 1989 American black comedy horror film directed by Bob Balaban and starring Randy Quaid, Mary Beth Hurt, Sandy Dennis and Bryan Madorsky. Set in a 1950s California suburb, the film centers on a 10-year old boy (Madorsky), who suspects that his parents (Quaid and Hurt) are not what they seem. It was Balaban’s debut as a feature film director.

Released by Vestron Pictures on January 27, 1989, the film received a mixed response from critics and fared poorly commercially, but has since developed a cult following. Randy Quaid’s performance earned him an Independent Spirit Award nomination for Best Male Lead.

Plot 
In 1958, the Laemle family - father Nick, mother Lily, and their 10-year old son Michael - move from Massachusetts to a Californian suburban neighborhood. As young Michael is very socially awkward and also has an overly active imagination, he has trouble making friends at school. He is also prone to strange and disturbing dreams, such as dreaming that he has jumped into bed, only for it to collapse into a pool of blood.

Emotionally distraught from the move and the dreams, Michael is traumatized by accidentally viewing his parents having sex (he believes that he is seeing them biting into one another) and by viewing his father cutting into a corpse in the Division of Human Testing at Toxico, where Nick is developing an Agent Orange-style chemical defoliant for use in jungles. As time progresses, Michael begins to suspect that his parents are cannibals, after he discovers (or dreams that he discovers) dismembered body parts hanging on a meat hook in the basement. Michael is convinced that what he has seen is true, much to the chagrin of his school guidance counselor, Millie Dew. One afternoon, Millie goes home with Michael in order to convince him that he is imagining everything, only for the two of them to find a corpse in the basement. Michael runs up to his room while Millie, hiding in the pantry, is found and killed.

When Nick and Lily arrive home, Michael attacks his father. Later that evening, Nick tries to feed Michael (possibly human) meat, assuring him that he will develop a taste for it like his mother did, while Lily smiles in agreement, but he fights back and manages to stab his father in the shoulder. Nick then tries to kill Michael, only for Lily to try to protect Michael and die in the process. Michael is then chased around the house by his injured father, who accidentally runs into a gas line due to his injuries. Nick breaks the gas line and then runs into a shelf of wine bottles, which he pulls down onto him and presumably dies. As gas fills the room, Michael has barely enough time to escape before the gas ignites and blows up the house.

The film ends with Michael's paternal grandparents assuming his care. After placing him to bed, Michael's grandparents leave him a midnight snack of a suspicious-looking meat sandwich, implying perhaps that his father learned cannibalism from his parents.

Cast
 Bryan Madorsky as Michael Laemle
 Randy Quaid as Nick Laemle
 Mary Beth Hurt as Lily Laemle
 Sandy Dennis as Millie Dew
 Juno Mills-Cockell as Sheila Zellner
 Kathryn Grody as Miss Baxter
 Deborah Rush as Gladys Zellner
 Graham Jarvis as Marty Zellner
 Helen Carscallen as Grandmother
 Warren Van Evera as Grandfather
 Wayne Robson as Lab Attendant

Production 

Parents was filmed in Toronto, Ontario, Canada.

Release 

Parents grossed $870,532 in the US on a budget of $3 million.

Home media 
The film was released on DVD on 25 May 1999 in its unmatted full-screen format. The original DVD was out of print for a brief period of time, before the film was re-released in the DVD format as a double feature with the film Fear, and presented for the first time in widescreen since its original theatrical release. Lionsgate released the film on Blu-ray on January 31, 2017, as part of their Vestron Video Collector's Series line.

Reception 
Rotten Tomatoes, a review aggregator, reports that 53% of surveyed critics gave the film a positive review.

Roger Ebert of the Chicago Sun-Times rated it two out of four stars, writing that the film's tone never satisfyingly settles on satire, comedy, or horror. Variety wrote "There is not enough weight or complexity to the material to justify the serious approach, and while the potential for considerable black comedy exists, Balaban only scratches the surface. The laughs never come." Gene Siskel surprised Ebert on their TV show when he said that he actually enjoyed the film and found its weirdness and style entertaining. The New York Times wrote "The satire of the 50s is more bland than biting, dependent on authentically garish costumes and sets. And when the horror-film scenes begin to intrude on normal life (what is hanging from the cellar ceiling, anyway?) Mr. Balaban can't make the dark elements seem comic enough to mesh with the rest of this nightmarish joke."

Writing for The Washington Post, both Hal Hinson and Desson Thomson called it a flawed but impressive debut. Kim Newman of Empire called it an "unfairly neglected, perfectly creepy and disturbing suburban bizarro drama."

The film has developed a cult following.

Ken Russell compared it with Blue Velvet and went as far as calling it better than the David Lynch film.

References

External links 
 
 
 

1989 films
1989 comedy films
1989 directorial debut films
1989 horror films
1980s American films
1980s black comedy films
1980s comedy horror films
1980s English-language films
American black comedy films
American comedy horror films
Films about cannibalism
Films about dysfunctional families
Films directed by Bob Balaban
Films scored by Jonathan Elias
Films set in 1958
Films shot in Toronto
Vestron Pictures films